A list of films produced by the Tollywood (Bengali language film industry) based in Kolkata in the year 2012.

Highest-grossing
Awara
Challenge 2
Khokababu

January–March

April–June

July–September

October–December

 ems.

References

2012
Lists of 2012 films by country or language
Bengali